Join the Cavalry was a military song popular during the American Civil War. The verses detail various feats performed by Jeb Stuart's troopers, the cavalry arm of the Army of Northern Virginia, while the chorus urges the listener to "join the cavalry". Occasionally, the title is recorded as "Jine the Cavalry". The song was most common in Virginia.

"Jine the Cavalry!" was among Stuart’s favorite songs, and became the unofficial theme song of his Confederate cavalry corps. It recounts many of Stuart’s early exploits, including the daring "Ride around the Army of the Potomac" in the early summer of 1862, and the Confederate Cavalry raid to Chambersburg, PA in October 1862. One of Stuart’s men, Sam Sweeney, was an accomplished banjo player and often serenaded Stuart and his officers during the Gettysburg Campaign.

JINE THE CAVALRY!

We're the boys that rode around McClellan(ian),
Rode around McClellan(ian), Rode around McClellan(ian)!
We're the boys that rode around McClellan(ian),
Bully boys, hey! Bully boys, ho!

CHORUS:  
If you want to have a good time, jine the cavalry!
Jine the cavalry! Jine the cavalry!
If you want to catch the Devil, if you want to have fun,
If you want to smell Hell, jine the cavalry!

Ol' Joe Hooker, won't you come out of The Wilderness?
Come out of The Wilderness, come out of The Wilderness?
Ol' Joe Hooker, won't you come out of The Wilderness?
Bully boys, hey! Bully boys, ho!

CHORUS:  
If you want to have a good time, jine the cavalry!
Jine the cavalry! Jine the cavalry!
If you want to catch the Devil, if you want to have fun,
If you want to smell Hell, jine the cavalry!

We're the boys who crossed the Potomac(ica), who
Crossed the Potomac(ica), who crossed the Potomac(ica)!
We're the boys who crossed the Potomac(ica),
Bully boys, hey! Bully boys, ho!

CHORUS:  
If you want to have a good time, jine the cavalry!
Jine the cavalry! Jine the cavalry!
If you want to catch the Devil, if you want to have fun,
If you want to smell Hell, jine the cavalry!

We're the boys that rode to Pennsylvania,
Rode to Pennsylvania, rode to Pennsylvania!
We're the boys rode to Pennsylvania,
Bully boys, hey! Bully boys, ho!

CHORUS:  
If you want to have a good time, jine the cavalry!
Jine the cavalry! Jine the cavalry!
If you want to catch the Devil, if you want to have fun,
If you want to smell Hell, jine the cavalry!

The big fat Dutch gals hand around the breadium,
Hand around the breadium, hand around the breadium!
The big fat Dutch gals hand around the breadium,
Bully boys, hey! Bully boys, ho!

CHORUS:  
If you want to have a good time, jine the cavalry!
Jine the cavalry! Jine the cavalry!
If you want to catch the Devil, if you want to have fun,
If you want to smell Hell, jine the cavalry!

Lyrics are in the public domain.

Stuart's ride around McClellan

Songs of the American Civil War
Virginia in the American Civil War
Year of song unknown